Blepephaeus subcruciatus is a species of beetle in the family Cerambycidae. It was described by White in 1858.

References

Blepephaeus
Beetles described in 1858